The Field Marshal Francisco de Melo da Gama de Araújo e Azevedo (May 16, 1773 – January 17, 1859 in Quinta da Garrida, Parish of St. João da Ribeira Ponte de Lima, Portugal) was a field marshal of the Portuguese Army and governor of Diu in Portuguese India between March 21, 1821 and January 1840.

Name variations
Francisco da Silva e Melo da Gama Araújo
Francisco de Melo da Gama e Araújo
Use of "Melo", "Mello", "Meló" and "Melô";
There are multiple variations of  "e"; "de" and "da".

Biography 
Últimas Gerações de Entre-Douro e Minho, José de Sousa Machado, editora J. A. Telles da Sylva (Ano: 1931. Ano da Edição: 1989)
Notícias Históricas de Portugal e Brasil 1751-1800, Manuel Lopes de Almeida, Coimbra Editora 1964
Revista do Instituto Histórico e Geográfico Brasileiro, Tomo XXI, 1858
Os Generais do Exército Português, Volume II Tomo I, Coronel António José Pereira da Costa, Biblioteca do Exército, Lisboa 2005
Nobiliário das Famílias de Portugal, Felgueiras Gayo, editora Carvalhos de Basto, 2ª Edição, Braga 1989

External links
 Genealogy Project Geneall

1773 births
1859 deaths
Portuguese colonial governors and administrators
Portuguese generals
18th-century Portuguese people
19th-century Portuguese people
People from Ponte de Lima